NGC 383 is a double radio galaxy with a quasar-like appearance located in the constellation Pisces.  It is listed in Halton C. Arp's 1966 "The Arp Atlas of Peculiar Galaxies." Recent discoveries by the National Radio Astronomy Observatory in 2006 reveal that NGC 383 is being bisected by high energy relativistic jets traveling at relatively high fractions of the speed of light.  The relativistic electrons in the jets are detected as synchrotron radiation in the x-ray and radio wavelengths.  The focus of this intense energy is the galactic center of NGC 383.  The relativistic electron jets detected as synchrotron radiation extend for several thousand parsecs and then appear to dissipate at the ends in the form of streamers or filaments.

There are four other nearby galaxies NGC 379, NGC 380, NGC 385, and NGC 384 which are suspected of being closely associated with NGC 383, as well as several other galaxies at relatively close distance.

A Type 1a supernova, SN 2015ar, was discovered in NGC 383 in November 2015.

See also 

 Relativistic beaming
 Relativistic jets

References

External links
 
 3C31 = B0104+321 (Alan Bridle / 18 June 2008)
 www.jb.man.ac.uk/atlas/
 Wikisky image of NGC 383

Radio galaxies
0383
00689
31
Pisces (constellation)
17840912